The 2022 Philippine Senate election was the 34th election of members to the Senate of the Philippines for a six-year term. It was held on May 9, 2022.

The seats of the 12 senators elected in 2016 were contested in this election, and the senators that will be elected in this election serve until June 30, 2028. The winners of this election will join the winners of the 2019 election to form the Senate's delegation to the 19th Congress of the Philippines with the senators elected in 2019 serving until June 30, 2025.

As the senatorial and presidential candidates appeared on the same ballot on election day, presidential candidates were able to present or endorse a slate of senatorial candidates.

Candidates associated with the UniTeam Alliance won a plurality of seats up for election, with three candidates associated with Team Robredo–Pangilinan winning seats. Several slates shared candidates. UniTeam candidate Migz Zubiri was elected Senate president.

Background 
In the 2019 midterm election, Hugpong ng Pagbabago (HNP), the electoral coalition backed by the Duterte administration, won nine out of the twelve seats up, with three seats going to other parties and independents, and the primary opposition coalition, the Liberal Party-backed Otso Diretso, failed to win any seats. This led to the senators not affiliated with the Liberals to reelect Tito Sotto to the Senate presidency in 2019.

In 2021, Senator Panfilo Lacson said that a plot to oust Sotto from the Senate presidency allegedly "fizzled out" as the plotters failed to muster 13 votes to oust him.

Electoral system 

The Philippines has a 24-member Senate elected at-large. Every three years since 1995, 12 seats are disputed. For 2022, the seats disputed in 2016 will be contested. Each voter has 12 votes, of which one can vote one to twelve candidates, or a multiple non-transferable vote; the twelve candidates with the most votes are elected.

Senators are limited to serving two consecutive terms, although they are eligible for a third (and succeeding) non-consecutive term. Only half of the seats are up in every senatorial election. The winning senators will succeed those elected in 2016, and will join those elected in 2019 to form the 19th Congress.

Each party or coalition endorses a slate of candidates, typically not exceeding a 12-person ticket. A party may also choose to invite "guest candidates" to complete its slate. The party may even include, with the candidates' consent, independent candidates and candidates from other parties as the party's guest candidates. Parties also may form coalitions to endorse a multi-party slate of candidates.

Winning candidates are proclaimed by the Commission on Elections (COMELEC), sitting as the National Board of Canvassers (NBOC). The NBOC usually proclaims senators-elect by batches, if that candidate can no longer fall to worse than twelfth place in the tally. Post-proclamation disputes are handled by the Senate Electoral Tribunal, a body composed of six senators and three justices from the Supreme Court.

Participating parties

Party-switching before the election 
For senators running in this election cycle:

 Panfilo Lacson (independent) switched to Reporma on July 29, 2021, to run for president. He left Reporma on March 24, 2022, to become an independent.
 Joel Villanueva (CIBAC) became an independent when he filed his candidacy to run for senator.
 Manny Pacquiao (PDP–Laban) switched to PROMDI when he filed his candidacy to run for president.
 Dick Gordon (Independent) switched to Bagumbayan–VNP when he filed his candidacy to run for senator.

For senators whose seats are not up:

 Bong Go (PDP–Laban) switched to PDDS when he ran for president on November 13, 2021.

Term-limited and retiring incumbents

Term limited incumbents 
The following are ineligible from running since they are on their second consecutive six-year term:

 Franklin Drilon (Liberal), retiring
In 2020, Drilon personally counted himself out in running for president in 2022. A year later, he said that he was planning to retire from politics after his term ends if the succeeding administration would not have a role for him.
 Ralph Recto (Nacionalista), running for House representative from Batangas's 6th district
In 2021, Recto says that he mulls swapping positions with his wife, representative from Batangas Vilma Santos. Recto did file his candidacy to run for congressman from Batangas's 6th district, the seat Santos decided not to seek reelection for. Recto ran on his district unopposed,
 Tito Sotto (NPC), running for vice president of the Philippines
In July 2020, Sotto said that retirement would be his first option in 2022, as opposed to running for a higher position. A year later, he said that he would be open to running for vice president as Senator Panfilo Lacson's running mate. A month after that announcement, Lacson announced that he would run for president, with Sotto as his running mate. Sotto lost the election to Sara Duterte.

Retiring incumbents 
The following senators' terms are ending in 2022. They were eligible to run again, but targeted other positions:

Panfilo Lacson (Reporma), running for president of the Philippines
 Lacson said in mid-2019 he would run for president if he has "a clear chance of winning." Two years later, it was announced that he would run for president instead of seeking re-election in the Senate, with an official announcement set on August 5. Days later, Lacson was sworn in as the new chairman of Partido para sa Demokratikong Reporma. Lacson lost the election to Bongbong Marcos.
Manny Pacquiao (PROMDI), running for president of the Philippines
On September 19, Pacquiao at first officially accepted the nomination of PDP–Laban's Pimentel faction for president in the upcoming 2022 election. On October 1, Pacquiao filed his candidacy under PROMDI of the late Lito Osmeña, while there were leadership issues with PDP–Laban. Pacquiao lost the election to Bongbong Marcos.
Francis Pangilinan (Liberal), running for vice president of the Philippines
In June 2021, Pangilinan announced that he would initially seek reelection in 2022. In October, he was selected to be Leni Robredo's running mate. Pangilinan lost the election to Sara Duterte.

Running for another position mid-term 
Ronald dela Rosa (PDP–Laban) originally filed to run for president of the Philippines, as Bong Go's presidential running mate. Dela Rosa withdrew later on. Bong Go then ran for president, switching from PDP–Laban to Pederalismo ng Dugong Dakilang Samahan (PDDS). Go himself officially withdrew on December 14.

Coalitions
As this Senate election is concurrently held with a presidential election, some presidential candidates have presented senatorial slates, which typically have up to 12 names to round up the twelve seats up for election. Due to a dispute, PDP–Laban, the ruling party, was split into two factions that are part of different coalitions. Some candidates are included in multiple coalitions as guest candidates.

1Sambayan 
After releasing its choices of presidential and vice presidential candidates on June 12, 2021, Independence Day, Howard Calleja, one of the convenors of the opposition group 1Sambayan (Isambayan) said that former Bayan Muna representative Neri Colmenares was one of the group's choices to have their endorsement.

After the announcement of Leni Robredo's initial 11-person slate, 1Sambayan said it would also announce who they would support soon, while maintaining that they supported unconditionally the Robredo–Francis Pangilinan ticket for president and vice president. Antonio Trillanes accused Makabayan candidate Neri Colmenares of supporting Isko Moreno instead of backing 1Sambayan's candidate Leni Robredo. Makabayan denied endorsing the incumbent Manila Mayor Isko Moreno, pointing out they had yet to make a decision on the matter. On January 19, 2022, 1Sambayan endorsed 7 Senate bets in Robredo's ticket. Later that month, they endorsed Neri Colmenares, who is not included in Robredo's slate.

Aksyon Demokratiko 
Aksyon Demokratiko was in talks with Nationalist People's Coalition, United Nationalist Alliance, and Partido para sa Demokratikong Reporma for an alliance. There have also been discussions between Aksyon president Isko Moreno and PDP-Laban's Manny Pacquiao, as well as between Moreno and the Liberal Party's Leni Robredo. On September 27, 2021, Aksyon announced two candidates, Samira Gutoc, who ran and lost in 2019 with the Liberals, and Carl Balita, for election. Former vice president and senator Noli de Castro filed to run for senator with Aksyon, but withdrew less than a week later. Jopet Sison, of Ipaglaban Mo! fame, replaced him. On February 24, Aksyon Demokratiko adopted John Castriciones of the PDP–Laban Cusi wing as a guest candidate, after a Duterte volunteer group he led endorsed Moreno the week before.

Labor and Ecology Advocates for Democracy 

Leody de Guzman of Partido Lakas ng Masa (PLM) unveiled a Senate slate composed of nine people including two incumbents. The three people running under De Guzman's party PLM are labor leader Luke Espiritu of Bukluran ng Manggagawang Pilipino (BMP) and environmentalists Roy Cabonegro and David D'angelo. On October, de Guzman endorsed six more names as guest candidates. On February 18, Teddy Baguilat was revealed as the 12th and final candidate included in the PLM's slate. After the completion of the slate, it was branded as "Labor and Ecology Advocates for Democracy."

Lacson–Sotto slate 
Senate President Tito Sotto announced his and Panfilo Lacson's candidacies for vice president and president, respectively, in July 2021. They also presented their initial list of possible senatorial candidates; these include mostly incumbents and former senators. In July 2021, an alliance between the Nationalist People's Coalition (NPC), United Nationalist Alliance (UNA) and Partido para sa Demokratikong Reporma has been the works with the possibility of the inclusion of Aksyon Demokratiko. A cooperation agreement has yet to be signed with the National Unity Party (NUP).

On October 14, Lacson hinted at a "surprise" senatorial candidate on their camp, while having already revealed 10 names, that includes incumbents. A day later, Lacson presented a 14-person slate (two more than the 12 open seats), which includes three from Lacson's Reporma, and six from Sotto's NPC.

At the start of the campaign period, the campaign dropped Herbert Bautista from their slate, citing Bautista's desire to represent the NPC in the UniTeam Alliance slate of Marcos and Duterte. In order to remain on multiple slates, the guest or common candidates agreed not to publicly endorse a particular presidential and vice presidential candidate. The next day, the campaign dropped Win Gatchalian from their slate, citing his personal endorsement of the Marcos-Duterte tandem at the UniTeam proclamation rally. Other common candidates, such as Juan Miguel Zubiri, who also attended the UniTeam event, and Dick Gordon, who attended the Robredo-Pangilinan rally, were not dropped because no public endorsements were made. On early April, Zubiri was ultimately dropped when he endorsed Marcos on a rally in his home province of Bukidnon.

MP3 Alliance 
PDP–Laban acting president Manny Pacquiao has been in separate talks with Aksyon Demokratiko's Isko Moreno and the Liberal Party's Leni Robredo. On September 19, 2021, Pacquiao formed an alliance with PROMDI and the People's Champ Movement (PCM).

On October 15, Pacquiao presented his senatorial slate that included candidates running for reelection, progressive leaders, and former senators. Pacquiao by that time only had eight candidates on his slate, as he said there were other people who wanted to be guest candidates.

Team Robredo–Pangilinan 

The Liberal Party (LP) was in talks of alliance-building with Panfilo Lacson, Joel Villanueva, Nancy Binay, and Isko Moreno. Minority Leader and LP Vice-chairman Franklin Drilon stated that if Vice President Leni Robredo chose not to run for the presidency, the party would be open to coalesce under Manny Pacquiao. In August 2021, the party released the names of its initial slate for the Senate consisting of three incumbents, one former senator, and one former candidate. In September 2021, Robredo met separately with Moreno and Pacquiao. The Liberal Party announced its initial slate on September 28, 2021.

On October 15, Robredo announced an 11-person slate, which included former rivals such as Vice President Jejomar Binay, and Francis Escudero, whom she beat for vice president in 2016. The 12th slot was being negotiated between Makabayan's Neri Colmenares and labor leader Sonny Matula. Colmenares said that it's Robredo's prerogative as the presidential candidate to choose her Senate slate. Colmenares later said that it was former senator Antonio Trillanes who was behind his exclusion from the line-up. Robredo announced that Sonny Matula was the 12th person in her Senate slate on October 22.

The slate was branded "Team Robredo–Pangilinan" or TRoPa during Robredo's proclamation rally in Naga, Camarines Sur.

Tuloy ang Pagbabago Coalition 

The Tuloy ang Pagbabago coalition's slate is mostly composed of current members of the Cabinet, former senators seeking a return to the Senate, or personalities identified with President Rodrigo Duterte. During the national convention by the Alfonso Cusi faction, the party nominated mostly Cabinet members and allied lower House representatives in its initial slate. The coalition will hold a proclamation rally and present their 11-point agenda in March.

UniTeam Alliance 

Partido Federal ng Pilipinas, one of the constituent parties of the UniTeam Alliance, announced that former presidential spokesperson Harry Roque of the People's Reform Party is a member of their senatorial slate. On January 20, 2022, UniTeam released their 10-person Senate slate. On February 5, the alliance added former Information and Communications Technology secretary Gregorio Honasan as the eleventh person on their slate; this is after Honasan's Reform Party nominated former Senator Bongbong Marcos and Sara Duterte for president and vice president, respectively. Sara Duterte announced Robin Padilla as the 12th and last member on February 16, however the Marcos camp later stated that he was not part of their official slate. By March 11, Duterte said that Padilla is a guest candidate.

Candidates 

A total of 178 people filed candidacies for senator. A total of 114 people were found to be disallowed by the commission for being nuisance candidates, disqualified for other reasons, or have their candidacies cancelled.

*Guest candidates

Opinion polling

Opinion polling in the Philippines is conducted by Social Weather Stations (SWS), Pulse Asia, OCTA Research, and other pollsters.

Per candidate
This list includes all individuals named by at least 10% of respondents in any of the surveys conducted after the campaigning officially began. The top 16 candidates with the highest favourability in each poll are listed below, where the top 12 are marked with a "black line". For a comprehensive list of all individuals included in the surveys, see the main article.

Per party
 Parties (excluding independents) with the plurality of seats in boldface.
 Parties (excluding independents) with the majority of seats are shaded by the party color.

Seats won
 Totals may not add up to 12 due to margin of error.

Seats after the election
Totals may not add up to 24 due to margin of error.

Per coalition 
Coalitions are expected to release 12-person slates for the election by the start of campaigning on February 8, 2022. On this section will be the surveys done after that day.

Campaign 
The official campaign period as set by the Commission on Elections starts on February 8, 2022, and ends two days before the election on May 7. 2022. Campaigning is not allowed on April 14 and 15, Maundy Thursday and Good Friday, and on May 8, election eve for election silence.

February 
Some candidates included in slates launched their candidacies in the proclamation rallies of their preferred presidential candidate. Some who were shared by multiple slates, opted to have their own proclamation rallies. Joel Villanueva launched his campaign via social media, with endorsements from presidential candidates Robredo, Lacson, Pacquiao and Moreno. Loren Legarda started her campaign at Liberman Gymnasium in Pandan, Antique. JV Ejercito did a motorcade around San Juan, Metro Manila, where he previously served as mayor. 9 out of 11 candidates in the UniTeam slate attended the rally in the Philippine Arena in Bulacan, while Gregorio Honasan sent his wife as his representative and Legarda gave a videotaped message. Jejomar Binay chose to hold his proclamation rally in Batangas. Team Robredo–Pangilinan's (TRoPa) slate was presented at that ticket's proclamation rally in Naga, where seven where able to attend, while two sent in a videotaped message. Just outside Manila City Hall, Moreno presented his three-person senatorial slate, who were all present; also in attendance was John Castricciones, who is running under the ruling PDP–Laban. At the Imus Grandstand in Cavite, the Lacson proclamation rally was attended by all three Reporma members, and two of the NPC members, while three of his guest candidates sent in videotaped messages. In the Pacquiao proclamation rally in General Santos, Lutgardo Barbo and Raffy Tulfo were presented as included in his slate, while five gave videotaped messages, and Win Gatchalian was represented by his fiancé Bianca Manalo.

On February 15, reports emerged that the Lacson–Sotto tandem dropped Jejomar Binay and Dick Gordon from their slate. The Lacson–Sotto campaign denied the reports, saying that the two are still in their slate, while Binay said that he honored their gentleman's agreement not to endorse other tandems. Meanwhile, the campaign also clarified that with their slate having 13 names, they have 10 people who will surely be within their slate and that they will campaign for these ten people moving forward.

March 
In SMNI's senatorial forum, Partido Lakas ng Masa candidate Luke Espiritu had a verbal spat with UniTeam candidates Larry Gadon and Harry Roque. Espiritu called out Gadon "It’s still my time, don’t be rude" when the latter was interrupting him on the topic of how schools should teach "correct values"; Gadon had earlier accused the Catholic Church of espousing anti-Marcos and pro-communist propaganda, failing to impart "correct values" upon children. Later in the forum, Roque said that "There was nothing respectful with what you said against me. The truth is that we are not talking about the dead Marcos. We are talking about the living Marcos,"  after Espiritu said that Roque was anti-Marcos before but "now that you were given a Senate spot under the party of Bongbong Marcos, you cry hallelujah and praise Marcos."

After several campaign rallies where he has been a part of, Sara Duterte clarified that Robin Padilla is now a guest candidate of the UniTeam. This was a change from her statement that Padilla is not yet a part of the alliance.

Later that month, presidential candidate Panfilo Lacson resigned from Partido para sa Demokratikong Reporma, and continued his candidacy as an independent. Hours after this development, Monsour del Rosario, one of Reporma's senatorial candidates, shifted his support from Lacson to Leni Robredo. The other non-guest candidates of the slate, Guillermo Eleazar, Minguita Padilla and Emmanuel Piñol, stayed loyal with Lacson.

April 
On early April, during the UniTeam campaign in his home province of Bukidnon, Juan Miguel Zubiri and his family publicly supported Marcos. This caused the Lacson campaign to drop him from their Senate slate. Later in the month, the Robredo campaign also removed Zubiri from their slate.

On the same day Zubiri was removed from TRoPa, Rodante Marcoleta announced that he was withdrawing his candidacy. The commission later confirmed that it had accepted his withdrawal. Marcoleta cited his poor showing in the surveys as the reason for his withdrawal, but stressed that he will continue to support Marcos and Duterte.

A day later, Kerwin Espinosa, one of those who accused senator Leila de Lima of being involved in the illegal drug trade in the New Bilibid Prison, recanted his statements on the case, and said that he was coerced by the police days after his father, Albuera mayor Rolando Espinosa Sr., was killed when the latter was being served his warrant of arrest. The Department of Justice downplayed the younger Espinosa's recantation, saying it did not affect their case against de Lima, who is currently detained, as he was not a witness.

May 
In early May, Rafael Zagos, former Bureau of Corrections director general and another witness in the de Lima drug case recanted his testimony. Ragos previously testified that de Lima accepted 5 million pesos from him via drug lord Peter Co, while she was Secretary of Justice, and that it was later used to fun her senatorial campaign in 2016.

A week before the election, Lorenzo Leviste, Loren Legarda's son, wrote in a Rappler column that he is "absolutely disgusted by my mother and what she has decided to do," that is, run under the UniTeam slate of Bongbong Marcos. Also on the same day, the Iglesia ni Cristo released its list of endorsements for the senatorial election via an announcement aired on Net 25. A day later, Labor and Ecology Advocates for Democracy dropped Agnes Bailen from their slate.

Results 

The commission originally expected to proclaim the winners in seven days. A week after the election, the commission said it plans to proclaim the winners on May 18.

The commission sitting as the National Board of Canvassers did proclaim the winning senators on May 18. The last certificate of canvass yet to be canvassed, the one from Lanao del Sur, will no longer materially affect which candidates win or lose.

UniTeam's Win Gatchalian and Migz Zubiri, shared guest candidate Joel Villanueva, and Risa Hontiveros of TRoPa all successfully defended their seats. Returning senators are UniTeam's Jinggoy Estrada, his half-brother JV Ejercito of the Lacson–Sotto slate, shared candidates Loren Legarda and Francis Escudero, and independent Alan Peter Cayetano. Neophyte senators are topnotcher Robin Padilla of Tuloy na Pagbabago, shared candidate Raffy Tulfo, and UniTeam's Mark Villar.

Two former senators, Gregorio Honasan, and Antonio Trillanes, lost in their bids to reenter the Senate.

Incumbents Dick Gordon and Leila de Lima did not successfully defend their seats.

Per candidate

Per coalition
The seats won totals does not account for guest candidates unless specified.

Per party

References 

2022 Philippine general election
Philippine Senate elections
May 2022 events in the Philippines